Schaalia is a genus of bacteria in the phylum Actinomycetota.

References

Actinomycetales
Gram-positive bacteria
Bacteria genera